This is a list of Wyoming suffragists, suffrage groups and others associated with the cause of women's suffrage in Wyoming.

Suffragists 

 Grace Raymond Hebard.
 Therese A. Jenkins.
 Esther Hobart Morris.
 Amalia Post.
 Louisa Swain.

Suffragists who campaigned in Wyoming 

 Susan B. Anthony.
 Redelia Bates.
 Harriot Stanton Blatch.
 Anna Elizabeth Dickinson.
 Inez Milholland.

See also 

 Women's suffrage in Wyoming
 Women's suffrage in states of the United States

References

Sources 

 
 
 

Politics of Wyoming
Wyoming suffrage
History of voting rights in the United States